Pustynga is a rural locality (a village) in Muravyovskoye Rural Settlement of Velsky District, Arkhangelsk Oblast, Russia. The population was 54 as of 2014.

Geography 
Pustynga is located 19 km northeast of Velsk (the district's administrative centre) by road. Vazhskaya Zapan is the nearest rural locality.

References 

Rural localities in Velsky District